Joseph McGann (born 24 July 1958) is an English actor. His roles include the lead role of Charlie Burrows, the "housekeeper" in the TV comedy series The Upper Hand (1990–1996), Night and Day and his voice role as Sir Gideon Ofnir in the video game Elden Ring (2022)

Life and career
McGann was born in Kensington, Liverpool to a metallurgist father also named Joe, and a teacher mother named Clare.

His three younger brothers – Paul, Mark and Stephen – are also actors. He also has a younger sister named Clare after their mother. Together with Stephen and Mark, he starred in Tom, Dick and Harry, a play by Ray and Michael Cooney at the Duke of York's Theatre, in 1995. That same year, all four brothers starred in the BBC drama The Hanging Gale.

In 1989, he portrayed Lord Glozelle in the BBC version of Prince Caspian. The following year, he started playing the role of Charlie Burrows in the long-running ITV sitcom The Upper Hand, alongside Diana Weston and Honor Blackman. During this period, he also appeared in All Creatures Great and Small and Dangerfield (TV series).

In 1992, he voiced "Masklin" in the TV adaptation of Truckers, the first of Terry Pratchett's three books in The Nome Trilogy. He featured as Grimes at the Chichester Festival Theatre in the 2003 stage musical adaptation (by Jason Carr and Gary Yershon) of the novel The Water Babies.

On 16 December 2007, he played one of the three Magi in BBC Three's Nativity; a live performance of the Bible story of Jesus's birth, set in modern-day Liverpool. His main solo song was "Lady Madonna", singing to the newly-born Jesus who is lying in a shopping trolley in a pub garage.

McGann appeared on tour with Fiddler on the Roof playing the paterfamilias, Tevye, in 2008 but left the show 2 months before the tour ended due to an arm injury sustained on stage. In 2009, he appeared on BBC's Celebrity MasterChef alongside Linda Barker and Ninia Benjamin and dropped out in the semi-finals. In May-June 2009, he appeared as Richard in "Lost Monsters" by Laurence Wilson at Liverpool's Everyman Theatre. As of 2011, he can be seen occasionally guest presenting STV's daily magazine show, The Hour, alongside regular host Michelle McManus.

In 2012, he was cast as Ray Say in a UK touring production of The Rise and Fall of Little Voice. However he dropped out of the tour midway through with understudy Phil Andrews taking over his role for the remainder of the tour. In October 2015, he joined the cast of Elf: The Musical, playing the role of Walter Hobbs at the Dominion Theatre.

It was announced in 2019 that McGann had joined the cast of Hollyoaks as Edward Hutchinson, the father of established character Tony Hutchinson (Nick Pickard). In December 2020, it was announced that McGann had filmed his final scenes on the soap, which aired later that month.

Filmography

References

External links
 
 Frank Carlyle chats to Joe McGann for Mersey Radio (22 September 2014)

1958 births
English male stage actors
English male television actors
Living people
English people of Irish descent
Male actors from Liverpool
Joe